The Abdurrahman Pasha Mosque, also called Clock Mosque or simply Peqin Mosque is a Cultural Monument of Albania, located in Peqin.

It was built in 1666 by Abdi Pasha the Albanian and resembled the Et'hem Bey Mosque in the Albanian capital Tirana. The mosque is located in the central square of the old town at the main route between Durres and Elbasan. Later destroyed by a fire, it was rebuilt in the 1830s by a descendant of Abdi Pasha, Cafer Sadık Pasha. Its minaret and its dome were destroyed in 1970 by the communist dictatorship under Enver Hoxha. The mosque was reconstructed in 1992.

See also
 Islam in Albania

References

Cultural Monuments of Albania
Mosques in Peqin
Buildings and structures in Peqin
Buildings and structures demolished in 1970
Mosques destroyed by communists
Rebuilt buildings and structures
Tourist attractions in Elbasan County
1666 establishments in the Ottoman Empire
Demolished buildings and structures in Albania